Kefersteinia lafontainei is a species of flowering plant from the genus Kefersteinia.

Description
Kefersteinia lafontainei is an  epiphytic orchid.

References

Flora of French Guiana
Zygopetalinae